Jeffrey D. Gramlich is a professor of accounting, a Howard D. and B. Phyllis Hoops Endowed Chair in Accounting, and a director of the Hoops Institute of Taxation Research and Policy at Washington State University (WSU). Previously, Gramlich served as the L.L. Bean/Lee Surace Endowed Chair at the University of Southern Maine. He has been a guest professor at Copenhagen Business School on several occasions. Earlier in his academic career he was a professor at the University of Hawaii's Shidler College of Business Administration.

Gramlich teaches decision-oriented courses in financial accounting, financial statement analysis and valuation. His research has been published in many accounting related journals.  Gramlich's most publicized research documented whistle-blowing assertions that Chevron, Texaco and the Government of Indonesia colluded to defraud U.S. federal and state governments of an estimated $9 billion in tax revenue.

Education
Gramlich earned a B.A. in accounting from Western State College of Colorado, a M.Acc. (Master of Accountancy) from University of Denver and a Ph.D. in Accountancy from the University of Missouri-Columbia. He passed the Certified Public Accountant exam in 1980 and became licensed in Colorado in 1981.

Academic positions
Gramlich has been the Howard D. and B. Phyllis Hoops Endowed Chair in the accounting department of Washington State University since 2014. He has also served as the Director of the Hoops Institute of Taxation Research and Policy and was the first holder of the related endowed chair. He was hired to promote the academic rigor of the program and strengthen WSU's professional tax programs.
  
From 2003 to 2014, he was the L.L. Bean/Lee Surace Professor of Accounting, University of Southern Maine. He served as the initial occupant of the university's first endowed chair and was hired to promote rigorous research, enhance the development of relationships between the university and the Maine business community, and deliver courses in financial statement analysis and financial accounting.

Gramlich supported Copenhagen Business School, Denmark, as a guest professor on numerous occasions between 1996 and 2006, where he collaborated on research with Danish colleagues and taught financial accounting in the Full-Time MBA program, financial accounting and financial statement analysis in the B.Sc.-International Business program, and financial accounting in the Summer University Program.

Gramlich was also a visiting professor for the University of Michigan Business School from 2001 to 2003, where he instructed the MBA and undergraduate courses in financial statement analysis and valuation. He also taught the MBA core financial accounting course.

Prior to these roles Gramlich was a professor of accountancy at Shidler College of Business at the University of Hawaii - Manoa from 1994 to 2003 where he was promoted to professor in June 2000 after achieving his tenure and promotion from associate professor in June 1994.

Gramlich was a visiting associate professor in the Department of Accounting and Auditing at McCombs School of Business at the University of Texas at Austin from 1995 to 1996, where he taught corporate tax to fifth-year students of the graduate professional accounting program.

Selected publications

Buccina, S., D. Chene, and J. Gramlich, "Accounting for the environmental impacts of Texaco's operations in Ecuador: Chevron's contingent environmental liability disclosures," Accounting Forum (2013), vol. 37, pp. 110–123.

Artz, N., J. Gramlich, and T. Porter, "Low-profit limited liability companies (L3Cs)," Journal of Public Affairs (2012), vol. 12(3), pp. 230–238.

Gold, J., J. Gramlich, and D. Kerr, “How the Dodd-Frank Act affects the standard of care required of broker/dealers,” Journal of Financial Services Professionals (2011), vol. 65(2), pp. 61–69.

Chene, D., J. Gold, and J. Gramlich, "The scope and practice of comprehensive financial planning: Survey results, current standards, and engagement letter recommendations," Journal of Financial Service Professionals (January 2010), pp. 47–59.

Fischer, P.E., J.D. Gramlich, B.P. Miller, and H.D. White, "Investor Perceptions of Board Performance: Evidence from Uncontested Director Elections," Journal of Accounting and Economics 48, 2-3 (December 2009), pp. 172–189.

Feng, M., J.D. Gramlich, and S. Gupta, "Special purpose vehicles: Empirical evidence on determinants and earnings management," The Accounting Review 84, 6 (November 2009), pp. 1833–1876.

Gupta, S., J. Moore, J. Gramlich, and M. A. Hofmann, "Empirical evidence on the revenue effects of state corporate income tax policies," National Tax Journal (2009), pp. 237–267.

Chene, D.G., J.D. Gramlich, and J. Sanders, "Is 2008 a Good Year to Elect Out of  Installment Sale Accounting?" Journal of Accountancy (September 2008).

Gramlich, J.D., W. Mayew, and M.L. McAnally, "Debt reclassification, earnings persistence, and capital market consequences," Journal of Business, Finance & Accounting (2006), pp. 1189-1212.

VanderLinden, D., and J.D. Gramlich, "Enhancing Risk-Controlled Returns on Excess Japanese Yen," Managerial Finance (2005), vol. 31, 10, pp. 35-47.

Gramlich, J.D., P. Limpaphayom, and S. G. Rhee, "Taxes, keiretsu affiliation, and income shifting," Journal of Accounting and Economics (2004), vol. 37, pp. 203-228.

Gramlich, J.D., and O. Sørensen, "Voluntary management earnings forecasts and discretionary accruals: Evidence from Danish IPOs," European Accounting Review (2004), vol. 13, 2, pp. 235-259.

Gramlich, J.D., and J.E. Wheeler, "How Chevron, Texaco and the Indonesian government structured transactions to save billions in U.S. income taxes," Accounting Horizons (June 2003), pp. 107-122.

Gabrielsen, G., J.D. Gramlich, and T. Plenborg, "Managerial ownership, information content of earnings, and discretionary accruals in a non-US setting," Journal of Business Finance & Accounting (2002), pp. 967-988.

Gramlich, J.D., M.L. McAnally, and J.K. Thomas, "Balance sheet management: The case of short-term obligations reclassified as long-term debt," Journal of Accounting Research (2001), pp. 283-295.

Choi, W.W., J.D. Gramlich, and J.K. Thomas, "Potential errors in detection of earnings management: Reexamining studies investigating the AMT of 1986" Contemporary Accounting Research'' (2001), pp. 571–613.

References

Year of birth missing (living people)
Living people
Accounting academics
University of Southern Maine faculty
University of Maryland Global Campus faculty
Ross School of Business faculty
University of Texas at Austin faculty